Margaret Randall (born December 6, 1936, New York City, USA) is an American-born writer, photographer, activist and academic. Born in New York City, she lived for many years in Spain, Mexico, Cuba, and Nicaragua, and spent time in North Vietnam during the last months of the U.S. war in that country. She has written extensively on her experiences abroad and back in the United States, and has taught at Trinity College in Hartford, Connecticut, and other colleges.

Biography
In 1958, she met with Elaine de Kooning in New Mexico, where the painter had a teaching position and they became friends. Margaret Randall being a fan of bullfights would take Elaine to Mexico to watch these events.

Randall moved to Mexico in the 1960s,  married the Mexican poet Sergio Mondragón and gave up her American citizenship. She moved to Cuba in 1969, where she deepened her interest in women's issues and wrote oral histories of mainly women, "want[ing] to understand what a socialist revolution could mean for women, what problems it might solve and which leave unsolved." Her 2009 memoir To Change The World: My Years in Cuba chronicle that period of her life. She lived in Managua, Nicaragua, from 1980 to 1984, writing about Nicaraguan women, and returned to the United States after an absence of 23 years.

Shortly after her return in 1984, she was ordered deported under the McCarran-Walter Act of 1952. The government’s case rested on two arguments.  First, while living in Mexico and married to a Mexican citizen, she had taken out Mexican citizenship, thereby presumably losing her U.S. citizenship. This was in 1967.  In addition, under McCarran-Walter, the government claimed that the opinions Randall expressed in several of her books were "against the good order and happiness of the United States". The INS district director gave the justification that "her writings go far beyond mere dissent". With the support of many well-known writers and others, Randall won a Board of Immigration Appeals case in 1989 ordering the INS to grant her adjustment of status to permanent residence and restoration of citizenship.

She now lives in Albuquerque, New Mexico, with her wife, the painter Barbara Byers. She travels widely to read and lecture. She was a professor at Trinity College in Hartford, Connecticut, and also taught briefly at the University of New Mexico, Macalester College, and the University of Delaware.

Among her best-known books are Cuban Women Now, Sandino’s Daughters, Sandino’s Daughters Revisited, and When I Look into the Mirror and see You:  Women, Terror and Resistance (all oral history with essay).

Recent books include Che On My Mind (essay), The Rhizome as a Field of Broken Bones (poetry), and  Haydée Santamaría, Cuban Revolutionary: She Led by Transgression (essays), .To Change the World: My Years in Cuba (memoir, with photos), Narrative of Power and First Laugh (essay), and Stones Witness, Their Backs to the Sea, My Town, Something's Wrong with the Cornfields, and Ruins (poems, with photos), and As If the Empty Chair / Como si la silla vacía (poems in tribute to the disappeared of Latin America, in bilingual edition, translations by Leandro Katz and Diego Guerra). Time’s Language: Selected Poems 1959-2018 was published by Wing’s Press in 2018. In 2020 Duke University Press brought out her memoir, I Never Left Home: Poet, Feminist, Revolutionary.

Two of Randall’s photographs are in the Capitol Collection at the Round House in Santa Fe, New Mexico. In 2017 she was awarded a medal for Literary Achievement by the state of Chihuahua, Mexico, in 2019 Poesía en Paralelo Cero gave her its Poet of Two Hemispheres Prize, and Casa de las Américas in Cuba gave her its prestigious Haydée Santamaría medal. That same year the University of New Mexico awarded her its Doctor Honoris Causa in Letters. In 2020 she won AWP’s George Garrett prize and Chapman University’s Paulo Freire distinction.

Randall's four children are Gregory (1960), Sarah (1963), Ximena (1964), and Ana (1969). Her ten grandchildren are: Lía, Martín, Daniel, Ricardo, Sebastián, Juan, Luis Rodrigo, Mariana, Eli and Tolo. She has two great grandchildren: Guillermo and Emma Nahui.

The desert of the U.S. Southwest is her spiritual home, and ancient ruins—here and in other parts of the world—are increasingly her greatest source of inspiration.

Works 
Her writings include:
 
 
 
 
 
 
 
 
 
 
 
 
 
 
 
 
 
 
 
 
 
 
 
 
 ; Northwestern University Press, 1995,

References

External links
 
 Margaret Randall in "Portraits: Social Activists of the Last Century" on Flickr
The Selected Correspondence of Margaret Randall collection held by Princeton University Library Special Collections

Writers on Latin America
20th-century American non-fiction writers
21st-century American non-fiction writers
20th-century American poets
21st-century American poets
American women poets
American feminist writers
American memoirists
American lesbian writers
Lesbian feminists
Central America solidarity activists
American expatriates in Cuba
American expatriates in Nicaragua
Writers from New York City
1936 births
Living people
20th-century American women writers
21st-century American women writers